The Lebanon national football team has represented Lebanon in international association football since 1940. The Lebanese Football Association (LFA) was founded in 1933 and became a member of the Fédération Internationale de Football Association (FIFA) three years later. However, the team did not play its first official international match until 27 April 1940, suffering a 5–1 defeat to Mandatory Palestine in a friendly game. In 1964, Lebanon joined the Asian Football Confederation (AFC) and continues to compete as a member of the organisation.

Players

See also
 List of Lebanon international footballers born outside Lebanon
 List of Lebanon women's international footballers

References

 
Association football player non-biographical articles